Veljko Uskoković (born 29 March 1971 in Cetinje, Montenegro) is a retired Montenegrin water polo player. His club achievements are: European Champion 2000 (Becej team), 4 times Yugoslav Champion (Budvanska rivijera and Becej) 4 times Yugoslav Cup Winner (Budvanska rivijera and Becej). 
Member of Yugoslav national water polo team from 1991 to 2002. Team captain from 1996 to 2001. From  Played more than 300 games, scored over 400 goals.

Won with national teams: gold medal at the European Championship in Athens 1991, Budapest 2001 and Malaga 2008, silver medal at the European Championship in Seville 1997, bronze at the Olympic games in Sydney 2000, played at Olympic games Atlanta 1996 and Beijing 2008, bronze at the World Championship in Perth 1998, silver at the World Championship in Fukuoka 2001, gold medal at the Universiade in Fukuoka 1995, gold medal at the Mediterranean games in Bari 1997. Played for the World's Best Water Polo Team 2000 and 2001. This success, in combination with geo-political changes, makes him the only water polo player in the world who won gold medals with four different national water polo teams: representing SFR Yugoslavia, FR Yugoslavia, Serbia and Montenegro and finally Montenegro.

He was given the honour to carry the national flag of Montenegro at the opening and closing ceremonies of the 2008 Summer Olympics in Beijing, becoming the 22nd water polo player to be a flag bearer at the opening and closing ceremonies of the Olympics.

From 2008 he is waterpolo coach in ''Primorac'' and ''Cattaro'' club in Kotor, Montenegro. He is waterpolo coach in junior national team, too. Best result as a coach silver medal in Junior  World  Championship 2016.

He was named best Montenegrin athlete in 1991 in Montenegro and best athlete in 2016.

Clubs honours 
 1999-00 LEN Euroleague -  Champion, with VK Bečej Naftagas

See also
 Montenegro men's Olympic water polo team records and statistics
 List of Olympic medalists in water polo (men)
 List of flag bearers for Montenegro at the Olympics
 List of World Aquatics Championships medalists in water polo

References

External links
 Official Website
 

1971 births
Living people
Montenegrin male water polo players
Serbia and Montenegro male water polo players
Olympic water polo players of Yugoslavia
Olympic bronze medalists for Federal Republic of Yugoslavia
Olympic water polo players of Montenegro
Yugoslav male water polo players
Water polo players at the 1996 Summer Olympics
Water polo players at the 2000 Summer Olympics
Water polo players at the 2008 Summer Olympics
Sportspeople from Cetinje
Olympic medalists in water polo
Medalists at the 2000 Summer Olympics
World Aquatics Championships medalists in water polo
Mediterranean Games medalists in water polo
Mediterranean Games gold medalists for Yugoslavia
Competitors at the 1997 Mediterranean Games
Universiade medalists in water polo
Universiade gold medalists for Serbia and Montenegro
Montenegrin water polo coaches